Lieven is a Dutch language masculine given name. A Germanic name, it derives from Lief-win, meaning "dear friend" (lieve still means "dear" in Dutch). The name was popular in the Low Countries through the Anglo-Saxon missionary Liafwin (Lieven in some sources and Latinized Lebuinus) who died around 775 in Deventer. Veneration of Saint Livinus of Ghent (supposedly c.580–657), who  was probably invented in the 10th or 11th century and modeled after Lebuinus, made the name popular in Flanders and especially Ghent. Alternative spellings are Lieve, Lievin and the French-appearing Liévin. People with the name include:

Lieven Bauwens (1769–1822), Flemish entrepreneur and industrial spy 
Lieven Ferdinand de Beaufort (1879–1968), Dutch biologist
Lieven Bertels (born 1971), Belgian musicologist, impresario and festival curator
Lieven Boeve (born 1966), Belgian Catholic theologian
Lieven Willemsz van Coppenol (1598–1667), Dutch calligrapher portrayed by Rembrandt
Lievin Cruyl (1634–bef.1720), Flemish priest, architect, designer and engraver
Lieven De Cauter (born 1959), Belgian philosopher, art historian, and writer
Liévin De Winne (1821–1880), Belgian portrait painter
Lieven Dehandschutter (born 1958), Belgian N-VA politician
Lieve Geelvinck (1676–1743), Dutch administrator of the Dutch East India Company, mayor of Amsterdam
Lieven Gevaert (1868–1935), Belgian industrialist
Lieven de Key (1560–1627), Dutch architect
Lieven van Lathem (1430–1493), Flemish painter and manuscript illuminator
Lieven Lemse (1505–1568), Dutch physician and author
Liévin Lerno (1927–2017), Belgian cyclist
Lieven Maesschalck (born 1964), Belgian physiotherapist
Lieven Scheire (born 1981), Belgian comedian
Lieve Verschuier (1627–1686), Dutch maritime painter
Lieven de Witte (c.1503–aft.1578), Flemish painter and architect

See also
Lieven, surname of a noble family named after Livonia 
Jan Lievens (1607–1674), Dutch painter, son of Lieven Hendricx 
Lievens (surname), Dutch patronymic surname
Liévin, a town in Northern France

References

Dutch masculine given names